Allophoron is a genus of fungi in the division Ascomycota. The relationship of this taxon to other taxa within the division is unknown (incertae sedis), and it has not yet been placed with certainty into any class, order, or family. This is a monotypic genus, containing the single lichen species Allophoron farinosum, found in Colombia. The genus and species were described as new in 1942 by Czech lichenologist Josef Nádvorník.

See also
 List of Ascomycota genera incertae sedis

References

Ascomycota enigmatic taxa
Monotypic Ascomycota genera
Taxa described in 1942
Fungi of Colombia
Taxa named by Josef Nádvorník